Davis House is a home in Albuquerque, New Mexico that was built in 1927–28.  It was listed on the U.S. National Register of Historic Places in 1980.  It was built as a model home, and its landscaping was designed by landscape architect A. W. Boehning, who designed landscaping in the entire development.

It was deemed "one of Albuquerque's best examples of a Period Revival Style, specifically the English or Ann Hathaway cottage style."

References

Houses on the National Register of Historic Places in New Mexico
Houses in Albuquerque, New Mexico
National Register of Historic Places in Albuquerque, New Mexico
New Mexico State Register of Cultural Properties
Houses completed in 1928